General elections were held in Aruba on 22 September 2017.

Electoral system
The 21 members of the Estates are elected by proportional representation.

Results

References

Aruba
2017 in Aruba
Elections in Aruba
September 2017 events in South America